In the 1994 Currie Cup tournament, a rugby union competition in South Africa, the Blue Bulls team from Northern Transvaal came 5th out of 10 teams and did not qualify for the final.

Northern Transvaal results in the 1994 Currie cup

 Northern Transvaal did not qualify for the 1994 Currie Cup final.

Statistics

1994 Currie cup log position

1988 - 1994 results summary (including play off matches)

Northern Transvaal
1994